La corona is a 2008 short American documentary film about a beauty pageant in a Colombian prison for women, directed by Amanda Micheli. It was nominated for an Academy Award for Best Documentary Short.

References

External links

La corona at Runaway Films
La corona at The Cinema Guild

2008 films
2008 independent films
2008 short documentary films
American short documentary films
American independent films
2000s Spanish-language films
Documentary films about the penal system
Films directed by Amanda Micheli
2000s American films